Limonius minutus is a species of beetle belonging to the family Elateridae.

It is native to Europe.

References

Elateridae